Horithyatira javanica is a moth in the family Drepanidae. It is found in Indonesia (Java).

References

Moths described in 1966
Thyatirinae
Moths of Indonesia